Galeão  is a neighborhood in the North Zone of Rio de Janeiro, Brazil.  It is located on Governador Island besides the Rio de Janeiro–Galeão International Airport.

References

Neighbourhoods in Rio de Janeiro (city)